Saint Joseph Boulevard (official in ) is a major boulevard located east of Mount Royal in Montreal, Quebec, Canada. Although it is mainly residential, it is a major east–west artery in the Plateau Mont-Royal and the Rosemont–La Petite-Patrie boroughs. Its intersection with D'Iberville Street is known as the infamous Tunnel de la mort (Death Tunnel). Laurier metro station  is located on the boulevard.

See also 
 Saint Joseph Boulevard (disambiguation)

Streets in Montreal
Boulevards